Oii-Chinese (國際陰陽人組織 — 中文版) is an intersex advocacy and support group and the Chinese-language affiliate of Organisation Intersex International. Oii-Chinese, founded by Hiker Chiu in 2008, is active in Taiwan, Hong Kong, and other areas in East Asia.

Mission and activities 

The organisation aims to end "normalising" surgeries on intersex children, promote awareness of intersex issues, and improve government recognition of gender. Chiu says that surgical "normalisation" practices began in Taiwan in 1953. As part of this mission, Chiu started a "free hugs with intersex" campaign at Taipei's LGBT Pride Parade in 2010. The organisation also gives lectures and lobbies government.

Affiliations 

Oii-Chinese is affiliated to Organisation Intersex International and a member of the International Lesbian, Gay, Bisexual, Trans and Intersex Association (ILGBTIA).  In 2015, Chiu was elected to the board of the ILGBTIA to represent ILGA Asia.

See also 
 Intersex human rights
 Intersex rights in China

References

External links 

Intersex medical and health organizations
Intersex support groups
Intersex rights organizations
Intersex rights in China
Intersex rights in Taiwan